Ted Cruz (born 1970) is a U.S. Senator from Texas since 2013. 

Senator Cruz may also refer to:

Benjamin Cruz (born 1951), Senate of Guam
Donovan Dela Cruz (born 1973), Hawaii State Senate
Michael Cruz (born 1958), Senate of Guam
Nilsa Cruz-Perez (born 1961), New Jersey State Senate